The Canadair CL-415 (Super Scooper, later Bombardier 415) and the De Havilland Canada DHC-515 are a series of amphibious aircraft built originally by Canadair and subsequently by Bombardier and Viking Air, and De Havilland Canada. The CL-415 is based on the Canadair CL-215 and is designed specifically for aerial firefighting; it can perform various other roles, such as search and rescue and utility transport.

Development of the CL-415 began in the early 1990s, shortly after the success of the CL-215T retrofit programme had proven a viable demand for a turboprop-powered model of the original CL-215. Entering production in 2003, in addition to its new engines, the aircraft featured numerous modernisation efforts and advances over the CL-215, particularly in terms of its cockpit and aerodynamics, to yield improved performance. By the time the programme's production phase had begun, it was owned by Bombardier, who continued production up until 2015. In October 2016, the CL-415 programme was acquired by Viking Air, aiming to produce an updated CL-515, since renamed the DHC-515 Firefighter, and to be produced in Calgary, Alberta, by De Havilland Canada.

Development

Origins
Introduced during 1966, the CL-215 was the first aircraft specifically designed to be a water bomber. A total of 125 aircraft were constructed prior to the final CL-215 being delivered during May 1990.

During 1987, in response to prevailing market trends towards more efficient, powerful and reliable turboprop powerplants, Canadair undertook the task of retrofitting 17 CL-215 airframes with the Pratt & Whitney Canada PW123AF engines. This engine provided a 15 percent power increase over the original piston engines, as well as enhanced reliability and safety. The retrofitted aircraft were designated CL-215T. Speaking during the new model's development, company officials recognised that market demand for the CL-215T was marginal, and thus not enough to justify developing an all-new aircraft. Despite this, it featured numerous enhancements, including the addition of powered flight controls, air conditioning in the cockpit, as well as various upgraded electrical and avionics systems. The most notable external features of the CL-215T retrofit were the aerodynamic additions to the wings and empennage.

Having conducted the relatively successful CL-215T programme, the company decided to develop a further improved model of the aircraft CL-415, which would take form as a new-build production series.
On 6 December 1993, the CL-415 conducted its maiden flight, while the first deliveries commenced during November 1994. One year later, a 180-day sales tour traversing 21 countries commenced using a CL-415 owned by the Quebec Government. That same year, Bombardier stated that it was in the planning phase of a six-point improvement plan for the CL-415, which was principally intended to diversify its capabilities.

Orders for the type were promptly received from several countries, which included several lease and purchase arrangements; by July 1996, 37 examples were reportedly in service with operators in Canada, France, Italy, and Spain.
Starting in 1998, the CL-415 was being assembled at Bombardier Aerospace's facility near North Bay/Jack Garland Airport in North Bay, Ontario, and tested on Lake Nipissing. During the 2010s, according to aerospace periodical Flight International, there was a downturn in sales of the type. A total of ninety-five CL-415s had been completed when Bombardier closed down the production line in October 2015, although the company continued to actively market the type as well as to provide support for the existing fleet beyond this date.

Viking era
For several decades, Bombardier had experienced a period of significant expansion until encountering financial hardship during the 2010s, largely brought on by the very high costs involved in developing the CSeries narrow-body airliner.
The much smaller Viking Aircraft started off as a component manufacturing specialist, which came to include the licensed production of parts of several of Bombardier's discontinued aircraft range, helping operators to keep them in service.
During 2008, Bombardier and Viking Air reached an arrangement under which the former sold the design documents and all intellectual property rights of all out-of-production de Havilland aircraft from the DHC-1 Chipmunk through the DASH-7 50 passenger STOL regional airliner to Viking.
Its unit cost in 2014 was  million US dollars.

On 20 June 2016, it was announced that Viking Air was in the process of purchasing the CL-415 type certificate from Bombardier, along with the older CL-215 and CL-215T models. The acquisition was finalised on 3 October 2016. Shortly following the acquisition, Viking began work on the design of a modernized CL-515 version. 

During December 2018, a full-flight CL-415 simulator, capable of simulating water scoop and bombing operations, received European Aviation Safety Agency (EASA) certification. Prior to this, pilot training had typically involved live flying of the aircraft.

On 21 June 2019, the Indonesian Ministry of Defense announced it was purchasing six CL-515s for delivery in 2024.

On 31 March 2022, Viking Air through De Havilland Canada renamed the CL-515 as the DHC-515, planning for production and final assembly in Calgary, Alberta, where the CL-215 and CL-415 are supported, with 22 letters of intent from European customers.

Design

The CL-415 has an updated cockpit, aerodynamics enhancements and changes to the water-release system as well, creating a modern firefighting amphibious flying boat for use in detecting and suppressing forest fires. Compared to the CL-215, the CL-415 has increased operating weight and speed, yielding improved productivity and performance. Due to the increased power of its pair of Pratt & Whitney Canada PW123AF turboprop engines, each capable of generating up to 1,775 kW of thrust, these are located closer to the fuselage in comparison to the CL-215's arrangement. While this repositioning would typically reduce lateral stability on its own, this is rectified via the addition of an inverted fixed leading edge slat forward of the righthand horizontal stabiliser. Furthermore, winglets have been adopted on this model for the purpose of improving directional stability.

The CL-415 was specifically developed to provide the capability to deliver large quantities of suppressant in quick response to fires. This is stored within large tanks which are located mostly beneath the cabin floor within the hull, although a header tank above this level is present on either side of the fuselage. The airframe is built for reliability and longevity, making extensive use of corrosion-resistant materials, predominantly treated aluminium, that facilitates its use in salt water. According to Flight International, the CL-415 has good handling on the water, being relatively easy to operate in comparison with several other amphibious aircraft. The CL-515 can hold up to 7,000 litres (1,850 US gallons), and has a refill time of 14 seconds.

The aircraft can also pick up partial loads in smaller areas, and can turn while scooping if necessary. Management of the water bombing system is centralised via a water status panel on the flight instrumentation, giving direct control to the pilots; various dispersal patterns and sequences can be selected. A manually-operated emergency dump lever is also present, bypassing this system. Bombardier have claimed that the type performs 6.9 water drops for every flight hours of the type. The CL-415GR variant features higher operating weights, while the CL-415 multi-role model is available for purposes in a paramilitary search and rescue role and utility transport.

Operational history

Derived from its predecessor's nickname, the aircraft has acquired the name "Super Scooper" in light of its greatly enhanced performance as a water bomber and fire suppresser. In recognition of its abilities, the aircraft was awarded in 2006 the Batefuegos de oro (gold fire extinguisher) by the Asociacion para la Promocion de Actividades Socioculturales (APAS) in Spain; the award citation in part read "This is the most efficient tool for the aerial combat of forest fires, key to the organization of firefighting in a large number of countries. The continuous improvements to meet the needs of forest firefighting have made these aircraft the aerial means most in demand over more than 30 years."

By 1999, a total of 51 orders had been secured for the type; operators have reportedly predominantly used the CL-415 for firefighting and maritime search and rescue purposes. Of the 95 built, seven had reportedly been removed from service as a result of several accidents by December 2007.

Variants

CL-415 The original model, 86 built.

CL-415MP Maritime patrol version, three built.

CL-415GR Improved version for the Hellenic Air Force, capable of higher operating weights. Six built.

CL-415EAF Enhanced Aerial Firefighter. In 2019, six CL-415EAF Superscooper aircraft were ordered by launch customer, Bridger Aerospace, due for delivery in April 2020.

 DHC-515 (formerly CL-515) updated version under development by Viking Air of British Columbia, later renamed as the DHC-515 and to be produced in Calgary, Alberta.

Operators 

In 2016/2019, there were 164 in-service CL-215 and CL-415s in 11 countries.

Accidents 

Out of the 95 CL-415s built, 12 have been destroyed in the following accidents:

 11 November 1997 – s/n 2025 – F-ZBFQ/Pelican 43 – Sécurité Civile France, near La Ciotat (France).
 16 August 2003 – s/n 2008 – I-DPCN – SOREM Italy, near Esine (Italy).
 8 March 2004 – s/n 2018 – F-ZBEZ/Pelican 41 – Sécurité Civile France, at Sainte Croix Lake (France).
 18 March 2005 – s/n 2051 – I-DPCK – SOREM Italy, near Seravezza (Italy).
 1 August 2005 – s/n 2011 – F-ZBEO/Pelican 36 – Sécurité Civile France, near Pietra Maggiore - Corsica (France).
 25 April 2006 – s/n 2039 – Hellenic Air Force.
 23 July 2007 – s/n 2055 (CL-415MP) – Hellenic Air Force, near Styra (Greece).
 23 July 2007 – s/n 2045 – I-DPCX – SOREM Italy, near Roccapreturo (Italy).
 24 August 2009 – s/n 2049 – Hellenic Air Force.
 3 July 2013 – s/n 2076 – C-FIZU – Canada, at Moosehead Lake (Canada).
 5 May 2014 – s/n 2050 – Hellenic Air Force.
 27 Oct 2022 - s/n 2008 - I-DPCN- Linguaglossa, Sicily, Italy

Specifications (CL-415)

See also

References

Further reading
 Pickler, Ron and Larry Milberry. Canadair: The First 50 Years. Toronto: CANAV Books, 1995. .
 Keijsper, Gerard. "Water-Bombers Required!" Air Forces Monthly, London: Key Publishing, July 2008 Issue.
 
 Marsaly, Frederic and Samuel Pretat. "Bombardiers d'eau/ Canadair Scoopers." Editions Minimonde76, May 2012, .

External links

 Airliners.net The Canadair CL-215 & 415
 Bombardier's homepage of the SuperScooper
 Canadair Waterbombers scooping water during the wildfires of 2022 in Gironde, France at
 Beautiran on the Garonne river (YouTube) - Beautiran
 Cambes on the Garonne river (YouTube) - Cambes, Gironde
 the Étang de Cazaux et de Sanguinet (YouTube) - Étang de Cazaux et de Sanguinet

415
1990s Canadian special-purpose aircraft
Flying boats
Amphibious aircraft
High-wing aircraft
Aerial firefighting aircraft
Aircraft first flown in 1993
Twin-turboprop tractor aircraft
De Havilland Canada aircraft